Edoardo Ugo Gori (born 5 March 1990, in Borgo San Lorenzo) is an Italian rugby union player and currently he plays as Scrum-half for Colomiers in Pro D2.

From 2010 to 2019 he played for Benetton Rugby.

He was selected to the 25-man Italian squad to face Argentina in November 2010. In the same month he made his Italy debut against Australia. He also played at the 2011 Rugby World Cup in New Zealand.
On 24 August 2015, he was named in the final 31-man squad for the 2015 Rugby World Cup.

References

External links
It's Rugby France Profile
Planet Rugby News
Benetton Traviso Player Profile

1990 births
Living people
People from Borgo San Lorenzo
Benetton Rugby players
Italian rugby union players
Italy international rugby union players
Rugby union scrum-halves
Sportspeople from the Metropolitan City of Florence